Peter Renaday is an American actor. His career spans several films and television shows. His major roles include Master Splinter in the Teenage Mutant Ninja Turtles, as well as Abraham Lincoln in The Hall of Presidents, and Henry in Country Bear Jamboree at Walt Disney World.

Career
In the 1980s, Renaday was cast as in the first animated adaptation of the  Teenage Mutant Ninja Turtles as Hamato Yoshi/Splinter, the mentor of the eponymous turtles from 1987 until the show's finale in 1996. Renaday would also reprise the role of Splinter during the non-musical spoken portions of the live action TMNT: Coming Out of Their Shells concert event during the inaugural show held and recorded at Radio City Music Hall, though he was not credited on the VHS release in 1990.

Personal life
Renaday was married to Florence Daniel from 1979 until her death on February 18, 2011. She worked as a secretary in the music department of the Walt Disney Studios for 35 years, including as executive secretary to two heads of the department. A coloratura soprano, she also featured as a vocalist on "The Sounds of Christmas" produced by Disneyland Records in 1973, alongside her husband.

Filmography

Film

Lt. Robin Crusoe USN (1966) – Pilot
The One and Only, Genuine, Original Family Band (1968) – Dakota Townsman (uncredited)
The Love Bug (1968) – Policeman on Bridge
The Computer Wore Tennis Shoes (1969) – Lt. Hannah
The Aristocats (1970) – the French milkman driver / La Petit Cafe cook / truck movers (voice, uncredited)
The Barefoot Executive (1971) – Policeman #1
The Million Dollar Duck (1971) – Mr. Beckert
The Adventures of Pinocchio (1972) – The Tuna Fish (English version, voice, uncredited)
Michael O'Hara the Fourth (1972, TV Movie) – Stan
Mystery in Dracula's Castle (1973, TV Movie) – Detective
An Eye for an Eye (1973) – Lt. Hayes
The Whiz Kid and the Mystery at Riverton (1974, TV Movie) – Reporter
The Strongest Man in the World (1975) – Reporter
The Shaggy D.A. (1976) – Roller Derby Ticket-Taker (uncredited)
The Rescuers (1977) – American Delegate (voice, uncredited)
The Cat from Outer Space (1978) – Bailiff
The Apple Dumpling Gang Rides Again (1979) – Jailer at Fort
The Last Flight of Noah's Ark (1980) – Irate Pilot
The Devil and Max Devlin (1981) – Studio Engineer
Murder in Texas (1981, TV Movie) – Funeral director
One Shoe Makes it Murder (1982, TV Movie)
Nausicaä of the Valley of the Wind (1984. 2005 Disney dub) – (English version, voice)
The River Rats (1984) – Cajun Doctor
The Black Cauldron (1985) – Henchman (voice)
Ultraman: The Adventure Begins (1987, TV Movie) – Cajun / Paramedic (voice)
My Neighbor Totoro (1988) – (2005 Disney version) (English version, voice)
Bébé's Kids (1992) – Announcer / President Lincoln / Impericon / Tommy Toad (voice)
Batman: Mask of the Phantasm (1993) – (voice)
T'was the Day Before Christmas (1993, TV Movie) – Lester (voice, uncredited)
Pom Poko (1994) – (English version, voice)
The Hunchback of Notre Dame (1996) – Frollo's Soldiers (voice)
Cats Don't Dance (1997) – Narrator (voice)
The Batman Superman Movie: World's Finest (1997, TV Movie) – (voice)
The Lion King II: Simba's Pride (1998) – (voice)
Antz (1998) – Soldier Ants (voice)
The Odd Couple II (1998) – Justice of the Peace
Mulan (1998) – Hun Army (voice)
The Prince of Egypt (1998) – Rameses's Soldiers (voice)
Ringmaster (1998) – (voice)
Scooby-Doo! and the Witch's Ghost (1999) – Mr. McKnight (voice)
The Road to El Dorado (2000) – Cortes's Guards (voice)
Shrek (2001) - Lord Farquaad's Guards (voice)
Howl's Moving Castle (2004) – (English version, voice)
Madagascar (2005) – Crowd Member (voice)
Tugger: The Jeep 4x4 Who Wanted to Fly (2005) – Pa Pump / Narrator (voice)
Black Dawn (2005) – Dr. Richard Turpin
The Ten Commandments (2006, TV Mini-Series) – Narrator (voice)
The Princess and the Frog (2009) – (voice)
Your Highness (2011) – (voice)
The Ghastly Love of Johnny X (2012) – (voice)
Soul (2020) - Abraham Lincoln (voice)

Television

ABC Weekend Specials – Felix the Furrier, President, Monkey #2
Adventures from the Book of Virtues – The King, additional voices
Angel – The Beast's Master
Aladdin – Man
Animaniacs – Abraham Lincoln, Bailiff
Batman: The Animated Series – 2nd Longshoreman
Batman: The Brave and the Bold – Uncle Sam, Abe Lincoln
Ben 10: Ultimate Alien – Sir George, additional voices
Bill & Ted's Excellent Adventures – Additional voices
Capitol Critters – Additional voices
CBS Storybreak – Additional voices
Challenge of the GoBots – Additional voices
Combat! – Louis
Dallas – Rigsby
Darkwing Duck – Derek Blunt
DuckTales – Additional voices
Defenders of the Earth – Mandrake The Magician
Gargoyles – Commander, Father, Fortress I Captain
General Hospital – John Jacks (1996)
G.I. Joe – Dr. Marsh, Amen-Ra
Godzilla: The Series – George
Happily Ever After: Fairy Tales for Every Child – Pig Daddy
Hooperman – Additional voices
Iron Man – Walter Stark
Justice League – Councillor, Graz
Kidd Video – Master Blaster
Mad – Old Spock, additional voices
Mortal Kombat: Defenders of the Realm – Additional voices
Night Priest – Juvenile Services Worker
Nothing Sacred – Director
Phantom 2040 – Unnamed in the episode "The Magician", but is clearly Mandrake the Magician
Samurai Jack – Grandmaster Tan Zang, Priest
Saturday Supercade – Space Marshall Vaughn
Scooby-Doo and Scrappy-Doo – Additional voices
Sectaurs – Additional voices
Superman: The Animated Series – Captain, News Anchor, Clerk
Teenage Mutant Ninja Turtles – Splinter, Vernon Fenwick (2nd voice), additional voices
The Adventures of Don Coyote and Sancho Panda – Additional voices
The Bad News Bears – Entwhistle
The Greatest Adventure: Stories from the Bible – Additional voices
The Grim Adventures of Billy & Mandy / Evil Con Carne – President Abraham Lincoln, additional voices
The Legend of Prince Valiant – King William, additional voices
The New Batman Adventures – Auctioneer
The Pirates of Dark Water – Additional voices
The Real Adventures of Jonny Quest – Kane, High Lama
The Real Ghostbusters – Ebenezer Scrooge
The Sylvester & Tweety Mysteries – T.V Announcer, Louie Z. Anna
Touched by an Angel – Fr. O'Malley
The Transformers – Grapple, additional voices
TaleSpin – Captain William Stansbury (oddly enough, his voice work for the episode "Her Chance to Dream" in this series spinoff of Disney's The Jungle Book made him sound eerily similar to Sebastian Cabot, who voiced the character of Bagheera from the original full-length movie).
Walt Disney's Wonderful World of Color – Reporter, Stan
Wildfire – Additional voices

Video games

Age of Mythology – Agamemnon
Spider-Man vs. The Kingpin – Kingpin
Assassin's Creed – Al-Mualim
Assassin's Creed: Revelations – Al-Mualim
Avatar: The Game – Additional voices
Baten Kaitos Origins – Lyuvann
Batman & Robin – Bane
Champions: Return to Arms – Narrator
Dead Rising – Sean Keanan, additional voices
Dead Rising: Chop Till You Drop – Additional voices
Disney-Pixar Games Age 5+: Mike's Monstrous Adventure – Additional voices
Dragon Age: Origins – Duncan
EOE: Eve of Extinction – Agla
EverQuest II – Additional voices
Fallout: New Vegas – No-bark Noonan, Easy Pete, Cannibal Johnson, Heck Gunderson, Loyal, Doctor Henry, Judah Kreger
From Russia with Love – M, additional voices
Gears of War 3 – Adam Fenix, Various stranded
Halo Wars – Covenant Minister, additional voices
Heroes of Might and Magic V: Tribes of the East – Additional voices
Jeanne d'Arc – Richard
Labyrinth of Crete – Zeus
Lair – Guardian 2
Law & Order: Justice is Served – David Benninger, Dmitri Petrov
Lightning Returns: Final Fantasy XIII – Additional voices
Lost Odyssey – King Ghotza
Marvel Super Hero Squad Online – Odin
Marvel Ultimate Alliance – Namor, Odin
Metal Gear Solid 2: Sons of Liberty – Richard Ames
Metal Gear Solid 2: Substance – Richard Ames
Ninja Gaiden II – Dagra Dai
Ninja Gaiden Sigma 2 – Dagra Dai
Outlaws – Chief Two Feathers, Cowboy 1
Return to Castle Wolfenstein – Monk
Return to Castle Wolfenstein: Operation Resurrection – Monk
Return to Castle Wolfenstein: Tides of War – Monk
Revenant – Tendrick
Rogue Galaxy – Father Paul
Shadow of Rome – Cicero
Star Trek: Armada II – Additional voices
Star Wars: The Old Republic – Additional voices
Star Wars: Uprising – Shortpaw, Trade League Male, Rebel Male
Star Wars: X-Wing vs. TIE Fighter – Additional voices
Summoner 2 – Imarbeth
Viewtiful Joe 2 – Dr. Cranken
The Bourne Conspiracy – Additional voices
The Matrix: Path of Neo – The Key Maker, The Architect, Police/Security

Audio drama
Star Wars: Tales of the Jedi: Dark Lords of the Sith – Exar Kun
Adventures in Odyssey – numerous characters 1994–2015

Theme park attractions
The Hall of Presidents – Abraham Lincoln
Country Bear Jamboree – Henry the M.C. and also Max the Deer
20,000 Leagues Under the Sea: Submarine Voyage – Captain Nemo
The Many Adventures of Winnie the Pooh – The Narrator (Walt Disney World, Disneyland and Hong Kong Disneyland versions)
Tomorrowland Transit Authority PeopleMover – Narrator (1994 to 2009)
Buzz Lightyear Astro Blasters - Space Ranger

Albums
Mickey Mouse Splashdance – Mickey Mouse
Yankee Doodle Mickey – Mickey Mouse
The Story and Song of the Haunted Mansion – The Ghost Host (original voice, but replaced by Paul Frees in The Haunted Mansion attraction)

Toys
The Talking Mickey Mouse – Mickey Mouse

Shorts
A Distant Thunder – Harold Shenson
Cellar Doors – Frank
Dad... Can I Borrow the Car? – Actor
Obliteration – Doctor
The Miracles of Jesus – Additional voices
The Visitant – Narrator

Video
Teenage Mutant Ninja Turtles: Coming Out of their Shells Tour – Splinter (uncredited)
Teenage Mutant Ninja Turtles: The Turtles Awesome Easter – Splinter
Terrifying Tales – Additional voices

References

External links
 
 

Living people
American male radio actors
American male stage actors
American male voice actors
Audiobook narrators
Male actors from Louisiana
People from New Iberia, Louisiana
20th-century American male actors
21st-century American male actors
Year of birth missing (living people)